Araria district is one of the thirty-eight districts of Bihar state, India. Araria district is a part of Purnia division. Araria town is the administrative headquarters of this district.

Etymology
During the British Raj, the area was under the administration of a British district collector and municipal commissioner, Alexander John Forbes (1807-1890) of East India Company. Forbes had a bungalow at the same location. Consequently the area was known as 'residential area' also abbreviated as 'R-area'. Over time, the name transformed to 'Araria' and the neighbouring subdivision came to be known as 'Forbesganj'.

History
Araria district is a part of the Mithila region. Mithila first gained prominence after being settled by Indo-Aryan peoples who established the Mithila Kingdom (also called Kingdom of the Videhas).

During the late Vedic period (c. 1100–500 BCE), Kingdom of the Videhas became one of the major political and cultural centers of South Asia, along with Kuru and Pañcāla. The kings of the Kingdom of the Videhas were called Janakas. The Mithila Kingdom was later incorporated into the Vajjika League, which had its capital in the city of Vaishali, which is also in Mithila. The territory of the present-day district became Araria sub-division of the erstwhile Purnia district in 1964. Araria district was formed in January 1990 as one of the administrative districts of under Purnia Division.

2017 North Bihar Floods
2017 Floods affected 19 districts of North Bihar causing death of 514 people, in which Araria district accounted for 95 deaths alone. Floods have claimed 215 lives in Araria over 18 years, of which 61 in 2016.

Geography
The famous village of Araria is Dehti

Politics 
  

|}

Economy
In 2006 the Indian government named Araria one of the country's 250 most backward districts (out of a total of 640) though it has also been enlisted in the list of 112 aspirational districts of India by NITI Aayog. It is one of the 36 districts in Bihar currently receiving funds from the Backward Regions Grant Fund Programme (BRGF).

Demographics

According to the 2011 census Araria district has a population of 2,811,569, roughly equal to the nation of Jamaica or the US state of Utah. This gives it a ranking of 139th in India (out of a total of 640). Its population growth rate over the decade 2001-2011 was 30%. Araria has a sex ratio of 921 females for every 1000 males, and a literacy rate of 55.1%. 6.00% of the population lives in urban areas. Scheduled Castes and Scheduled Tribes make up 13.61% and 1.38% of the population respectively.

Hinduism is the majority religion. Muslims are majority in Araria and Jokihat blocks, and are in near-majority in Palasi block.

At the time of the 2011 Census of India, 28.71% of the population in the district spoke Urdu, 25.05% Hindi, 20.57% Maithili (including Thati), 2.17% Bengali, 2.10% Kulhaiya, 1.91% Surjapuri and 1.05% Santali as their first language. 16.43% spoke languages recorded as 'Others' under Hindi on the census.

Administration
The district is divided into two subdivisions, Forbesganj subdivision and Araria subdivision.

Notable people

Phanishwar Nath 'Renu', novelist and story writer.
Mohammed Taslimuddin Former Union Minister of State
Subrata Roy, chairman of Sahara Group
Quaiser Khalid IPS, Maharashtra Cadre, Poet, Educationist
Pradeep Kumar Singh BJP Politician, Member of Lok Sabha
Yahay Rahmani  Social Activist

See also
 Districts of Bihar
 Araria Lok Sabha constituency

References

External links

 Araria district website

 
Purnia division
Districts of Bihar
Minority Concentrated Districts in India
1990 establishments in Bihar